Simmer in Your Hotseat is the debut album by Boston-based band The Main Drag, originally released on indie label Endless Recordings in 2004. It was recorded by Adam Arrigo himself while still in college, with the help of Matt Levitt (violin/string arrangements) and contributions from various guest musicians.

Background
Arrigo and Levitt had been collaborating for over three years, and with a successful first recording of "Admit One" they began to produce their debut record. With the help of local producers and musicians, Arrigo began producing Simmer In Your Hotseat over the summer of 2004, drawing on material spanning two years. While working on the album, Arrigo was employed full-time at a local mental hospital in Lynn, MA, where he ran exercise and music groups for schizophrenics, head injury patients, etc. The album title was taken from an exercise tape, Sittercise, which Arrigo used in his morning groups. The tape professed activities such as: "Ride your bicycle and milk that cow!" But there was one command that no one seemed to understand: "There's hot oil on your seat...simmer! Simmer in your hot seat!" This command thrust the room into mass confusion, and the tape insisted on returning to it: "Alright, you're done riding that donkey? Let's simmer again!" While the origin of this title is quite ridiculous, it reflects the album's recurring themes of different types of debilitation.

Endless Recordings, The Main Drag's label at the time, arranged for the band to open for Arcade Fire in November, 2004. In 2005, a video was made for the song Famous Last Words, starring Adam Arrigo, Cory Levitt, Nate Reticker-Flynn, and Tom Keidel.

Track listing
All songs written and produced by Adam Arrigo, except "I'll Drink to That" (Arrigo/Le-Khac).

"North Shore, Music Therapist" - 4:46
"Broken Clocks" - 4:11
"Admit One" - 4:46
"Tunnel Lights" - 3:41
"Tax Season" - 4:09
"Bicycle Paths and Crosswalks" - 2:59
"Withhold" - 4:50
"Famous Last Words" - 4:23
"Disappointed You" - 4:46
"I’ll Drink to That" - 5:00

Personnel
Adam Arrigo: vocals, guitars, drums (tracks 3, 5, 9)
Matt Levitt: violin/arrangements, backup vocals (track 9)
Cory Levitt: bass (tracks 1, 4, 8)
Omar Tuffaha: bass (tracks 2, 3, 5, 7)
Long Le-Khac: bass (tracks 9, 10), keyboard (track 10)
Nate Reticker-Flynn: drums (tracks 2, 7, 8)
Richard Wilner: drums (tracks 1, 4, 10)
Brett Hitchner: keyboard (tracks 4, 8)
Patrick Mangan: Irish fiddle (track 7)
Ellen Gorra: cello (track 3)
Eric Adler: banjo (track 9)
Dan Cardinal: bass (track 5)
Recording and mixing: Adam Arrigo
Mastering: Sid Obando
Artwork by Matthew Lauprete, CD art by Gordon Cieplak

References

External links
The Main Drag's official website
The Main Drag's MySpace

2004 debut albums
The Main Drag albums